Kalms is a surname. Notable people with the surname include:

Barry Kalms, Australian Paralympic weightlifter and athlete
Charles Kalms (1898?-1978), British businessman
Frederick Kalms (1897–1977), Australian tennis player
Stanley Kalms, Baron Kalms (born 1931), British businessman